Neptunus is an extinct genus  of crabs belonging to the family Portunidae.

These epifaunal carnivores lived during the Eocene of India, Miocene of Brazil and Quaternary of United States, from 37.2 to 0.0 Ma.

Species
Neptunus granulatus † (H. Milne Edwards, 1834)

References

Portunoidea